Caniadaeth y Cysegr is a Christian religious radio programme of congregational hymn-singing, produced in the Welsh language by BBC Radio Cymru. Traditionally broadcast on a Sunday afternoon with R. Alun Evans presenting the hymns, it comprises recorded excerpts from Cymanfaoedd Canu (plural of Cymanfa Ganu or Singing Festival) from across Wales. Largely amateur singers sing in four voice harmony on this program.

The program was first broadcast on the BBC Home Service on 15 February 1942, it is the longest running Welsh language broadcast. 

In its archive it has a recording of every hymn in the Welsh hymn book caneuon ffydd.

References

External links
 BBC Radio Cymru - Caniadaeth y Cysegr website 

BBC Radio Wales programmes
Religious radio programs
BBC Home Service programmes
1942 radio programme debuts